In Greek mythology, Archilycus (Ancient Greek: Ἀρχίλυκον) or Areilycus, was the father of Archesilaus and Prothoenor  (by Theobula), who were the leaders of the Boeotians in the expedition against Troy. His father was Itonus, son of Boeotus while his brothers were Hippalcimus, Electryon, and Alegenor.

Family 
Archilycus is a minor character in the myth and his genealogy is discussed in the following excerpts:
 Diodorus Siculus, Library of History, Book 4.67.7:And Itonus, the son of Boeotus, begat four sons, Hippalcimus, Electryon, Archilycus, and Alegenor. Of these sons Hippalcimus begat Peneleos, Electryon begat Leïtus, Alegenor begat Clonius, and Archilycus begat Prothoënor and Arcesilaüs, who were the leaders of all the Boeotians in the expedition against Troy.
 Hyginus, Fabulae 97:Arcesilaus, son of Areilycus and Theobula, from Boeotia, with 10 ships

Notes

References 

 Diodorus Siculus, The Library of History translated by Charles Henry Oldfather. Twelve volumes. Loeb Classical Library. Cambridge, Massachusetts: Harvard University Press; London: William Heinemann, Ltd. 1989. Vol. 3. Books 4.59–8. Online version at Bill Thayer's Web Site
 Diodorus Siculus, Bibliotheca Historica. Vol 1-2. Immanel Bekker. Ludwig Dindorf. Friedrich Vogel. in aedibus B. G. Teubneri. Leipzig. 1888–1890. Greek text available at the Perseus Digital Library.
 Gaius Julius Hyginus, Fabulae from The Myths of Hyginus translated and edited by Mary Grant. University of Kansas Publications in Humanistic Studies. Online version at the Topos Text Project.

Boeotian characters in Greek mythology